Family MacAlpin(e) is a Scottish clan without a Hereditary Chief recognized by the Lord Lyon King of Arms. However, following a Petition to the Lord Lyon King of Arms, a Family Convention (or Derbhfine) was held at Abbotsford House the home of Sir Walter Scott on 10 September 2016.  The Family Conclave selected and recommended Michael Todd McAlpin Senior for the role of Commander. On 19 April 2017 Michael received his Commission as Commander of MacAlpine from Dr. Joseph Morrow the Lord Lyon.   This Commission has empowered him to do and perform all acts and functions proper for a period of ten years or until a Chief is named.

History

According to tradition the MacAlpine, or MacAlpin, is most purely Celtic of all the Highland Scottish clans. They are believed to be of royal descent from Kenneth MacAlpin. He united the Picts and Scots from the year 850 into one kingdom and moved his capital from Perthshire to Dunadd beside Loch Crinan in Dál Riata. The MacAlpine surname is still common in Scotland today.

The former chiefs apparently had their seat on lands that are now Dunstaffnage Castle in Argyll, which was an early capital of Kenneth MacAlpin, who was King of the Picts and according to myth, the first King of Scots.

See also

Siol Alpin

External links

References

Armigerous clans
Scottish clans